Sir Richard Vyvyan of Trelowarren, 3rd Baronet (28 September 1681 – 1724) was a prominent Jacobite.

Richard Vyvyan was born in Colan, Cornwall. In 1697 he married a distant cousin, Mary Vivian, of Trewan Hall, St Columb Major, this uniting two branches of the family which had been separated for three centuries.

Sir Richard Vyvyan was involved in the Jacobite uprising in Cornwall of 1715 and was imprisoned in the Tower of London. His wife Mary joined him there and, while in the Tower, gave birth to a daughter. His widow survived him by 32 years, dying in 1756.

Marriage and issue
Richard Vyvyan married Mary Vivian of Trewan Hall in the parish of St Columb Major. They had 6 sons and 4 daughters:

 Francis Vyvyan 4th Baronet (Became High Sheriff of Cornwall in 1739)
 Richard Vyvyan was born 1701 and married Philippa Piper. Ancestors of the Vyvyans of Withiel. Many became rectors there.
 Charles Vyvyan
 Thomas Vyvyan
 John Vyvyan  
 James Vyvyan
 Loveday Vyvyan
 Bridget Vyvyan
 Anne Vyvyan (born in the Tower of London)
 Frances Vyvyan

He died in Mawgan-in-Meneage, Cornwall in 1736(? 12 October 1724).

References

External links
 Vivian/Vyvyan family

1681 births
1736 deaths
Baronets in the Baronetage of England
People from Cornwall
Members of the Parliament of England for Mitchell
Members of the Parliament of Great Britain for Cornwall
Cornish Jacobites
English MPs 1701
English MPs 1701–1702
English MPs 1702–1705
English MPs 1705–1707
British MPs 1707–1708
British MPs 1710–1713
Members of the Parliament of England (pre-1707) for Cornwall